The Hawkins-Whitshed Baronetcy, of Killincarrick in the County of Wicklow and of Jobstown in the County of Dublin, was a title in the Baronetage of the United Kingdom. It was created on 16 May 1834 for Admiral Sir James Hawkins-Whitshed. The title became extinct on the death of the third Baronet in 1871.

Elizabeth Hawkins-Whitshed, daughter of the third Baronet, was a mountaineering pioneer.

Hawkins-Whitshed baronets, of Killincarrick and Jobstown (1834)
Sir James Hawkins-Whitshed, 1st Baronet (1762–1849)
Sir St Vincent Keene Hawkins-Whitshed, 2nd Baronet (1801–1870)
Sir St Vincent Bentinck Hawkins-Whitshed, 3rd Baronet (1837–1871)

References

Extinct baronetcies in the Baronetage of the United Kingdom